Robert Hutton (born April 7, 1967) is an American businessman and Republican politician from Waukesha County, Wisconsin.  He is a member of the Wisconsin State Senate, representing the 5th Senate district since January 2023.  He previously served in the Wisconsin State Assembly from 2013 through 2020.

Biography

From Brookfield, Wisconsin, Hutton graduated from University of Wisconsin–Whitewater. Former Owner and CEO in the logistics industry. He also served on the Waukesha County board of supervisors. In November 2012, Hutton was elected to the Wisconsin State Assembly as a Republican.

References

External links
 
 

1967 births
Living people
People from Brookfield, Wisconsin
University of Wisconsin–Whitewater alumni
Businesspeople from Wisconsin
County supervisors in Wisconsin
Republican Party members of the Wisconsin State Assembly
Republican Party Wisconsin state senators
21st-century American politicians